The Temple of Juno Caelestis is an archaeological site in Dougga, Tunisia. The ruined temple was dedicated to the Roman goddess Juno, herself an evolution of the Punic goddess Tanit. The temple was built between 222 and 235 AD, and is one of the best preserved temples dedicated to Juno in Africa.

Description 
The temple was built between 222 and 235 AD during the reign of Severus Alexander. The temple was dedicated to the Roman goddess Juno, who the residents of Dougga widely associated with the Punic goddess Tanit. As opposed to other archologoical sites at Dougga, the Temple was built on the outer edges of the city. The temples' tenemos is shaped like a crescent, a traditional symbol of Juno. 

The temple was first excavated in the 1890s, and restoration work on the temple began in 1904. Renewed interest in Dougga's archologicla sites resulted in the temple being examined 1999 and 2002.

References 

Temples of Juno
3rd-century religious buildings and structures
Destroyed temples
Roman sites in Tunisia